Nomini Grove is an unincorporated community in Westmoreland County, in the U. S. state of Virginia.

History
A post office has been in operation at Nomini Grove since 1848. Nomini is a name derived from a Native American language meaning "deep current".

References

Unincorporated communities in Virginia
Unincorporated communities in Westmoreland County, Virginia